Bharata is a legendary king featured in Hindu literature. He is a member of the Chandravamsha dynasty, and becomes the Chakravarti (universal monarch). He is regarded to be the ancestor of the Pandavas, the Kauravas, Brihadhrata, and Jarasandha. The Bhāratas, a prominent historical tribe mentioned in the Rigveda, are regarded in Hinduism to be the descendants of Bharata. 

The legend of Bharata is featured in the Adi Parva of the Mahabharata, where he is mentioned as the son of Dushyanta and Shakuntala.  The story of his parents and his birth is related in Kalidasa's famous play, Abhijñānashākuntala.

According to popular tradition, Bhārata, the traditional name of the Indian subcontinent, is named after Bharata.

Literature

According to the Mahabharata (Adi Parva), Bharata was the son of King Dushyanta and Shakuntala and thus a descendant of the Lunar dynasty of the Kshatriya Varna. He was originally named Sarvadamana ("the subduer of all"); the Mahābhārata traces the events in his life by which he came to be known as Bharata ("the cherished"). Bharata's exploits as a child prince are dramatised in Kalidasa's poetic play Abhijñānaśākuntalam.

Legend

Mahabharata 
The Mahabharata states that King Dushyanta was once hunting in the forests, when he struck a fawn with his arrow. The fawn fled to the ashrama of Sage Kanva, and the king followed it. Upon reaching the ashrama, the king saw Shakuntala watering the plants, accompanied by her friends, named Anasuya and Priyamvada. Dushyanta and Shakuntala fell in love with each other. Since the sage Kanva was absent from the ashrama, they married according to the gandharva rites, and Shakuntala soon became pregnant. The king presented her with his signet ring, and left for his palace. When Dushyanta left Shakuntala, she grew pensive, and did not realise the arrival of Durvasa to the ashrama. Reputed for his anger, Durvasa took her ignorance of him as a sign of disrespect, and cursed her to be forgotten by the man she was contemplating at that very moment. Shakuntala did not hear this curse being placed upon her. When Kanva returned and learnt of these events, he sent Shakuntala to the palace of Dushyanta. Owing to the curse, Dushyanta did not recognised her. Greatly aggrieved, while Shakuntala was returning to the ashrama, her mother, Menaka, took her to the ashrama of Kashyapa. Shakuntala delivered a son. The boy grew brave and fearless, and was able to subdue even the wildest of beasts in the region. Kashyapa, therefore, named him Sarvadamana (all-subduing). After a period of time, when Dushyanta was returning home after visiting Indra, he came across Shakuntala, recognised her, and took her and his son to his palace. This boy grew up to become Bharata. Bharata conquered the world, and acquired three wives, though the sons born of these wives were so cruel that they were slain. Bharata propitiated the devas for a son, and they gave him a boy, whom he named Vitatha, also called Bharadvaja. According to another account, Bharadvaja blessed Bharata with a son named Bhumanyu. Bharata ruled for twenty-seven thousand years, and therefore, the kingdom that he inherited and expanded came to be known as Bhārata, named after him.

Abhijñānaśakuntalā
According to a dramatised version of the events by the poet Kalidasa, the king Dushyanta married Shakuntala on his hunting expeditions in forests. He was captivated by Shakuntala's beauty, courted her in royal style and married her. He then had to leave to take care of affairs in the capital. She was given a ring by the king, to be presented to him when she was ready to appear in his court. Shakuntala gave birth to her child who was named Sarvadamana by the sage Kanva. Surrounded only by wild animals, Sarvadamana grew to be a strong child and made a sport of opening the mouths of tigers and lions and counting their teeth.

Children 
Bharata had a son named Bhúmanyu. The Adi Parva of Mahabharata tells two different stories about Bhúmanyu's birth. The first story says that Bharata married Sunanda, the daughter of Sarvasena, the King of the Kashi kingdom and begot upon her the son named Bhumanyu. According to the second story, Bharata had three wives, and nine sons from them. But these sons were not as their father and incapable of being his successor. Seeing Bharata's dissatisfaction, his wives in wrath slew all of their sons. Then Bhúmanyu was born out of a great sacrifice that Bharata performed with the help of the sage Bharadvaja.

The Skanda Purana gives another account of the adopted son of Bharata. When Angiras' son, Utathya's wife Mamata was pregnant, Utathya's younger brother Brihaspati moved by desire sought Mamata. But the child in her womb obstructed the deposition of Brihaspati's semen. Instead the child was delivered by Mamata. Mamata and Brihaspati started to quarrel over the guardianship of the child. At last they left the infant boy abandoned. The Maruta gods adopted the boy and named him Bharadvaja. When the wives of Bharata killed all their sons, the Marutas gave Bharadvaja to Bharata. Bharadvaja, also known as Vitatha, became the king.

See also
 Raghu
 Ikshvaku
 Yadu

Notes

References
 
 

Characters in the Mahabharata
Lunar dynasty